Bonham is a surname of English and Welsh origin derived from the French phrase, bon homme, literally meaning "good man".

Notable people having this surname include:

 Bill Bonham (born 1948), former Major League Baseball pitcher
 Sir George Bonham, 1st Baronet (1803–1863), British colonial governor and governor of Hong Kong
 Sir George Bonham, 2nd Baronet (1847–1927), British diplomat, son of the above
 Henry Bonham (disambiguation), several people
 Jack Bonham, Irish footballer, goalkeeper for Watford and Brentford
 James Bonham (1807–1836), American soldier who died at the Battle of the Alamo
 Jason Bonham (born 1966), drummer, son of John Bonham
 John Bonham (disambiguation), several people
 John Bonham (1948–1980), drummer of British classic rock band Led Zeppelin
 Mildred Amanda Baker Bonham (1840–1907), American traveler, journalist
 Milledge Luke Bonham (1813–1890), Confederate General
 Prudence Bonham (born 1948), Australian former politician and marine biologist
 Reginald Bonham (1906–1984), English blind chess player
 Tiny Bonham (1913–1949), pitcher for the New York Yankees and the Pittsburgh Pirates
 Tracy Bonham (born 1969), American musician

See also
Boneham
Goodman (surname)

References

Surnames of English origin